1870 is a 1971 Italian drama film directed by Alfredo Giannetti.

Cast
 Anna Magnani
 Marcello Mastroianni
 
 Mario Carotenuto
 Franco Balducci

References

External links

1971 films
1970s historical drama films
Italian historical drama films
1970s Italian-language films
Films directed by Alfredo Giannetti
Films set in Rome
Films set in 1870
Films scored by Ennio Morricone
1971 drama films
1970s Italian films